Micah Meisner is a former music video director who has won two Juno Awards on four nominations for his video work.

Meisner and k-os were nominated for Video of the Year at the 2003 Juno Awards for "Superstarr Pt. Zero".

Along with k-os and The Love Movement, he won the 2005 Juno Award for Best Video for B-Boy Stance.  At the 2006 Junos, Micah won the Best Video award for his Buck 65 video for "Devil Eyes".  At the 2007 Juno Awards, he was again nominated for Video of the Year along with The Love Movement, k-os, and Zeb Roc for "ElectriK HeaT: The Seekwill".

In 2005,  Now Magazine named Micah Meisner Best Video Director.

Selected works
K-os 
Superstarr Pt. Zero
B-Boy Stance
Love Song
Crab-buckit
Man I Used To Be 
Electrik Heat-The Seek-Will
Buck 65
Pants on Fire
Phil
463
Kennedy Killed The Hat
Devil's Eyes
The Dears
End of a Hollywood Bedtime Story
K’naan
Soobax
Metric
Monster Hospital
Poster of a Girl
Short Film
Red Shoes

References

Canadian music video directors
Year of birth missing (living people)
Living people
Juno Award for Video of the Year winners